Charles Tudor Hillyer, was a prominent Connecticut resident from East Granby who served as the state's Adjutant General from 1840 to 1845.  Prior to serving as adjutant general, he served in state politics, being elected to the state house of representatives in 1828 and 1830 and then elected to the state senate in 1836.  He was the first president of Charter Oak Bank in 1855, a position he held until 1879.  While serving as a bank president, he served as a Union general during the American Civil War.  Charles Hillyer also established Hillyer College which is now part of the University of Hartford.  Charles Hillyer was very active in the Y.M.C.A. and founded the chapter in Hartford, Connecticut.

References

Military personnel from Connecticut
Politicians from Hartford, Connecticut
Connecticut state senators
Union Army generals
University of Hartford
1800 births
1891 deaths
Connecticut Adjutant Generals
19th-century American politicians